The 49th International Film Festival of India was a film festival held from 20 to 28 November 2018 in Goa.  In the 49th event new sections such as "Sketch on Screen (Animation Film Package)", "A Retrospective of Masters" are inculcated. 212 films were being showcased during the event, with Israel being the country of focus.

Winners
Golden Peacock (Best Film): Donbass by Sergei Loznitsa 
IFFI Best Director Award: Lijo Jose Pellissery for Ee.Ma.Yau
IFFI Best Actor Award (Male): Silver Peacock Award: Chemban Vinod Jose for Ee.Ma.Yau
IFFI Best Actor Award (Female): Silver Peacock Award: Anastasiia Pustovit for When the Trees Fall
IFFI ICFT UNESCO Gandhi Medal: Praveen Morchhale for Walking With the Wind
IFFI Best Debut Director Award: Treb Monteras II for Respeto
Silver Peacock Special Jury Award: Milko Lazarov for "Ága"
Special Mention: Chezhiyan for To Let (India)

Special Awards
Life Time Achievement Award - Dan Wolman
IFFI Indian Film Personality of the Year Award: Salim Khan

Official Selections

Opening Film
 The Aspern Papers

Closing Film
Sealed Lips

International Competition

Indian Panorama

State Focus - Jharkhand (Special Section)

Mainstream Cinema Section

Controversy
On 22 November 2018 delegates who had gathered to watch the Danish crime thriller The Guilty began protesting at Kala Academy when they were not allowed to enter the theater. This led to a clash between them and the organizers. In the resulting argument, Rajendra Talak, vice-chairman of the Entertainment Society of Goa (ESG), was quoted as asking delegates from Kerala to "go back home". A complaint was filed by Kerala-based director Kamal KM to IFFI CEO, Ameya Abhyankar. Following this, 29 other Malayali delegates, including 11 National Film winners like Dileesh Pothen and Dr Biju, signed a petition requesting a formal apology from Talak. When asked to comment, Talak replied that he had told the delegates to go back as the show was housefull.

References

External links
 

2018 film festivals
2018 festivals in Asia
49
2018 in Indian cinema